Pachypsyllinae is a bug subfamily in the family Aphalaridae.

References

External links 

Aphalaridae
Hemiptera subfamilies